The second siege of Ochakov (now Ochakiv, Ukraine) was one of the major events of the Russo-Turkish War (1787–1792). It was known as "Özi Kuşatması" in Turkish.

In 1788, Russian forces led by Prince Grigory Potemkin and General Alexander Suvorov besieged the city, held by Ottoman troops commanded by Hasan Pasha. Despite Suvorov's urging to storm the city immediately, Potemkin had the Russian forces encircle Ochakov (Özi), bombarding the city and cutting off the defenders' supply of food and ammunition. By keeping his soldiers out of direct battle, Potemkin minimized Russian casualties, though he was accused by his generals of cowardice. The argument within the Russian headquarters about storming Ochakov continued during the entirety of the siege. 

The first combat was on May 31, with the arrival of the Turkish navy. The Russian flotilla lost a double-sloop while attempting to retreat. The Russian army began assaulting the city on July 9. On July 18, 1788, the Russians captured the strategically important Pirezin Island.

The Turks made several attempts to break the siege. On July 27, about 5,000 Janissaries attacked positions held by Cossacks and forced them to retreat. Suvorov personally led reinforcements and drove the Janissaries to the gates of Ochakov, but was injured.

Hasan Pasha expected reinforcements from the Turkish fleet, which gathered in Limans. However, Turkish reinforcements were cut off after being attacked by Admiral Senyavin's fleet. 

The conditions of both armies continued to decline, with the looming threat of disease and increasingly cold weather. Potemkin ultimately gave in to Suvorov's arguments for an assault on Ochakov. On the night of December 6 (December 17 in the Gregorian calendar), the Russians attacked and captured Hasan Pasha's palace, forcing its guards to surrender. Over 9,500 Turks were killed during the assault, and more than 4,000 were taken prisoner, including Hasan Pasha himself, but most of the city garrison was killed in the street fight, having lost about 20,000 men dead. The Russians lost 956 soldiers and had 1,829 wounded by the end of the operation.

The Russian victory was celebrated in a famous ode by Gavrila Derzhavin, and in a Te Deum by Giuseppe Sarti.

References

External links
 Кампания 1788 года - Очаковское сидение (Russian language)

Conflicts in 1788
Ochakov (1788)
Ochakov (1788)
Warfare of the Early Modern period
1788 in the Ottoman Empire
1788 in the Russian Empire
1780s in Ukraine
History of Mykolaiv Oblast
Alexander Suvorov
Battles of the Russo-Turkish War (1787–1792)